Zeynabad-e Zakhru (also Romanized as Zeynābād-e Zākhrū; also known as Zeynābād) is a village in Zakharuiyeh Rural District, Efzar District, Qir and Karzin County, Fars Province, Iran. At the 2006 census, its population was 306, in 69 families.

References 

Populated places in Qir and Karzin County